Peter Luczak was the defending champion, however he chose to not participate this year.
Steve Darcis won in the final 6–2, 6–4, against Daniel Muñoz-de la Nava.

Seeds

Draw

Finals

Top half

Bottom half

References
Main Draw
Qualifying Singles

Zucchetti Kos Tennis Cup - Singles
Internazionali di Tennis del Friuli Venezia Giulia
Zucchetti